Sárvár ( or ;) is a town in Vas County, Hungary.

Sárvár lies on the banks of the River Rába at Kemeneshát. The population is nearly 16,000. The town has become a tourist centre of international renown.

Etymology
Sár means "mud" in Hungarian, and vár means "castle". The latter is a common ending for settlement names.

History
During World War II, Sárvár was used as a centre for the internment for Polish soldiers who had arrived in Hungary in 1939. Later, during the World War II, Sárvár was used as a concentration camp for the internment for thousands of Serb families expelled by Hungarian soldiers from their homes in northern Serbia in 1941.
Now, there is a monument and graveyard for hundreds of Serbs who died in Sárvár concentration camp.

Sights
Sárvár's notable sights include the spa (with its famous medicinal water), a Baroque church, an arboretum, the park forest and the Csónakázó Lake. A number of rarities of cultural remains are shown in the exhibition halls of the Ferenc Nádasdy Museum.

Castle

Through the Nádasdy family, the castle of Sárvár, now called Nádasdy Castle, played a significant role in the progress of Hungarian culture in the 16th and 17th centuries. The first Hungarian book, The New Testament of 1541, was printed here. The knight's hall of the castle is decorated with the battle scenes of Lord Chief Justice Ferenc Nádasdy (married to the notorious Elizabeth Báthory) and with scenes from the Old Testament.

The Nádasdy Castle and estate later became a property of the kings of Bavaria, and the former King Ludwig III died there in 1921, three years after being deposed. During the World War II, the castle was used as the retreat of Ludwig's grandson Prince Albert of Bavaria.

Notable people
Péter Balassa, footballer
Alice Lok Cahana, Holocaust survivor and artist
Edward Eisner, physicist and professor
József Vass, politician
József Vida, hammer thrower
Takács de Saár, noble family
Zoltán Stieber, footballer

British avian flu outbreak

The Bernard Matthews Sága Foods plant in Sárvár, that processes turkeys, has been implicated in the H5N1 outbreak in Suffolk, England.

Twin towns – sister cities

Sárvár is twinned with:
 Seini, Romania
 Sonntagberg, Austria
 Steinheim an der Murr, Germany
 Uherské Hradiště, Czech Republic

References

External links

 in Hungarian, English, German and Czech
Accommodation in Sárvár

Populated places in Vas County
Spa towns in Hungary
Thermal baths in Hungary
Roman settlements in Hungary